A barachois is a term used in Atlantic Canada, Saint Pierre and Miquelon, Réunion and Mauritius Island to describe a coastal lagoon partially or totally separated from the ocean by a sand or shingle bar. Sometimes the bar is constructed of boulders, as is the case at Freshwater Bay near St. John’s, Newfoundland. Salt water may enter the barachois during high tide.

The bar often is formed as a result of sediment deposited in the delta region of a river or – as is the case in Miquelon – by a tombolo.

Name 
The English term comes from the French language, where the word is pronounced .

The term comes from a Basque word, barratxoa, meaning little bar. The popular derivation from the French barre à choir is without historical merit.

In Newfoundland English, the word has become pronounced (and sometimes written) as barrasway.

Examples

 Dark Harbour, Grand Manan, New Brunswick (photo)
 Barachois de Malbaie on the tip of the Gaspé Peninsula, fed by one of two Malbaie Rivers in Quebec and the Beattie, du Portage, and Murphy Rivers
 Grand Barachois, Miquelon Island
 Grand-Barachois, in Westmorland County, New Brunswick
 Barachois Pond Provincial Park in western Newfoundland
 Big Barasway and Little Barasway, communities on Newfoundland's Cape Shore
 Prince Edward Island National Park has several examples
 Percival Bay, off the Northumberland Strait, is also known as the Big Barachois
 The coves in the lagoon of Diego Garcia in the Indian Ocean
 Topsail Beach Provincial Park, Topsail
 Former settlement of Freshwater, near St John's, Newfoundland.
 Great Barachois, near Petit-de-Grat, Nova Scotia

References

Landforms
Bodies of water
Lagoons